The 1982 Congoleum Classic was a men's tennis tournament played on outdoor hard courts. It was the 9th edition of the Indian Wells Masters and was part of the 1982 Volvo Grand Prix. It was played at the La Quinta Resort and Club in La Quinta, California in the United States and was held from February 15 through February 21, 1982. Fourth-seeded Yannick Noah won the singles title and earned $32,000 first-prize money.

Finals

Singles

 Yannick Noah defeated  Ivan Lendl 3–6, 6–2, 7–5
 It was Noah's 1st singles title of the year and the 8th of his career.

Doubles

 Brian Gottfried /  Raúl Ramirez defeated  John Lloyd /  Dick Stockton 6–4, 3–6, 6–2
 It was Gottfried's 1st title of the year and the 70th of his career. It was Ramirez's 1st title of the year and the 72nd of his career.

References

External links
 
 ATP tournament profile
 ITF tournament edition details

 
La Quinta, California
1982 Congoleum Classic
Congoleum Classic
Congoleum Classic
Congoleum Classic
Congoleum Classic